A Woman's Revenge (German: Die Rache einer Frau) is a 1921 German silent drama film directed by Robert Wiene and starring Vera Karalli, Franz Egenieff and Olga Engl. In order to punish her cold, brutal aristocratic husband for murdering her lover, a woman becomes a common prostitute to shame him. The film received largely negative reviews.

Cast
 Vera Karalli 
 Franz Egenieff - Herzog von Sierra-Leone 
 Olga Engl   
 Margarete Kupfer   
 Alfred Haase   
 Boris Michailow - Geliebter der Herzogin 
 Auguste Prasch-Grevenberg

References

Bibliography
 Jung, Uli & Schatzberg, Walter. Beyond Caligari: The Films of Robert Wiene. Berghahn Books, 1999.

External links

1921 films
1921 drama films
German drama films
Films of the Weimar Republic
German silent feature films
Films directed by Robert Wiene
Films based on short fiction
Films based on works by Jules Barbey d'Aurevilly
German black-and-white films
Silent drama films
1920s German films